Cosas del Alma is a studio album by Adalberto Santiago recorded in 1984, and re-issued in 2002.

Track listing

Credits
Adalberto Santiago (vocals)
Gilberto Colón (piano)
Bob Quaranta (keyboard)
Luis Colón (bass)
Steve Sacks (baritone sax/flute)
Leonel Sánchez/Héctor "Bomberito" Zarzuela/Ite (trumpet)
Harry De Aguiar/Ángel "Cuqui" Lebrón (trombone)
Noey Matos (bongos)
Félix Cruz (congas)
Paul "Poly" Irlanda (timbales)
Cyro Baptista (percussion)
Isidro Infante (musical direction)

Arrangements
Gilberto Colón
Alberto Naranjo
Tito Puente
Steve Sacks
Ray Santos

Other credits
 Producer: Ray Santos
 Label: WS Latino. WS-4163, 2002

Sources
Album cover credits

1984 albums
Bolero albums
Spanish-language albums